The 2022 Michelin Ginetta Junior Championship is a multi-event, one make motor racing championship held across England and Scotland. The championship includes a mix of professional teams and privately funded drivers, aged between 14 and 17, competing in Ginetta G40s that are conformed to the technical regulations for the championship.

Teams and Drivers

Race calendar

Championship standings

Drivers' championship

References

External links 
 
 Ginetta Junior Championship News
 Ginetta Junior Update

Ginetta Junior Championship season
Ginetta Junior Championship seasons